L'isle joyeuse, L. 106 (The Joyful Island) is a piece for solo piano by Claude Debussy composed in 1904. According to Jim Samson (1977), the "central relationship in the work is that between material based on the whole-tone scale, the lydian mode and the diatonic scale, the lydian mode functioning as an effective mediator between the other two."

Structure

Exposition, bars 1–98
The introduction creates a whole tone context. This changes to an A Lydian context which, in bars 15–21, transitions, through the addition of G natural, to the whole tone context of a new motive at bar 21. This A Lydian context serves to transition from the whole tone mode on A to the A major context, inflected by occasional Lydian Ds, of the second theme at bar 67.

Middle, bars 99–159
The other transposition of the whole tone scale, avoided in the outer sections, is used and provides further harmonic contrast.

Recapitulation, bars 160–255
The second subject appears in pure A major, the "ultimate tonal goal of the piece". The opening codas "louder and more animatedly until the very end". It ends with a loud tremolo, a group of grace notes ascending to two octaves of A notes in the highest registers of the piano, and a quick, final arpeggio, the same arpeggio used to accompany the first use of the second subject, played downwards, hitting the lowest note on the keyboard (A0) markedly.

References

External links
 
 Recording by Alon Goldstein in MP3 format (archived on the Wayback Machine)

Compositions for solo piano
Compositions by Claude Debussy
1904 compositions